Taraxacum laevigatum, the rock dandelion or red-seeded dandelion, is a species of dandelion that grows in Europe, including Great Britain. Rarely, Taraxacum laevigatum can be found in the northern parts of North America.

References

laevigatum
Plants described in 1813
Taxa named by Augustin Pyramus de Candolle
Invasive plant species in Japan